The 1928 United States presidential election in Louisiana took place on November 6, 1928, as part of the wider United States presidential election. Voters chose ten representatives, or electors, to the Electoral College, who voted for president and vice president.

Louisiana voted for the Democratic nominee, Governor Alfred E. Smith of New York, over the Republican nominee, Secretary of Commerce Herbert Hoover of California. Smith ran with Senator Joseph Taylor Robinson of Arkansas, while Hoover's running mate was Senate Majority Leader Charles Curtis of Kansas.

Smith won Louisiana with 76.29 percent of the popular vote. It was Smith's third strongest state after South Carolina and Mississippi.

Results

Results by parish

See also
 United States presidential elections in Louisiana

References

Louisiana
1928
1928 Louisiana elections